Sant'Antonino is a municipality in the district of Bellinzona, Ticino, Switzerland.

Sant'Antonino may also refer to:
 Sant'Antonino, Haute-Corse, France, on the island of Corsica
 Sant'Antonino di Susa, Turin, Piedmont, Italy

See also
 Antoniana (disambiguation)
 Antoniano (disambiguation)
 Antonino (disambiguation)
 Sant'Antonio (disambiguation)
 Sant'Antonino Martire, Quattro Castella, church in Emilia Romagna, Italy